Willkommen im Jenseits is the first full-length album of the German band Mondsucht.

Track listing
All songs written and produced by Mondsucht.
"Eiskalter Engel" – 4:54
"Bittersüßer Tod" – 4:37
"Der Totentanz" – 4:45
"Das Versprechen" – 4:12
"Dunkle Seelen" – 4:40
"Das Jenseits" – 2:43
"Die Stadt" – 4:12
"Verlies der Ewigkeit" – 4:28
"Ohne Dich" – 5:00
"Zahnloser Vampir" – 4:00

Personnel
 Robert N. – vocals
 Astrid M. – vocals

External links
 Mondsucht Discography Info

2000 albums
Mondsucht albums
Alice In... albums